Le Concert des Nations is an orchestra using period instruments, which performs the orchestral and symphonic repertoire from the Baroque to Romanticism: 1600 - 1900. The orchestra was created in 1989, the youngest of the groups conducted by the Catalan maestro and viola da gamba virtuoso Jordi Savall. Le Concert des Nations is the first orchestra of its kind made up of musicians who originate mainly from Latin countries (Spain, South America, Italy, Portugal, France as well as many other countries). The name Le Concert des Nations refers to the work by François Couperin as an assembly of "tastes" and bears the mark of the Age of Enlightenment. Le Concert des Nations is the orchestra of La Capella Reial de Catalunya.

References

External links
Artists Management  page on Le Concert des Nations

Early music orchestras
Musical groups established in 1989